Sigfried "Siggi" Held (born 7 August 1942) is a German former football player and coach. He played as an attacking midfielder or forward.

Born in Freudenthal, Sudetenland (now Czech Republic), Held's first football club was Kickers Offenbach. In 1965 he became a player in the Bundesliga with Borussia Dortmund. During his career he played 442 games (72 goals) in the Bundesliga, for Dortmund, Offenbach and Bayer 05 Uerdingen. He also made 41 appearances for the West Germany national team, including the final of the 1966 World Cup.

After his retirement as a professional player in 1981 he became a football coach – 1982–83 for FC Schalke 04, 1986–89 for the Iceland National Football Team, 1989–90 for Galatasaray, 1991–93 for Admira Wacker Wien, 1993–95 for Dynamo Dresden, 1995 for Gamba Osaka and 1996–98 for VfB Leipzig.

2001–2003 he was coach for the national team of Malta. In 2004, he became coach for the Thailand national football team, but was suspended after only five months. As of February 2009, he works as fan relations supervisor with Borussia Dortmund.

Managerial statistics

Honours

Player

Club
Borussia Dortmund
 UEFA Cup Winners' Cup winner: 1965–66
 Bundesliga runner-up: 1965–66

International
West Germany
 FIFA World Cup runner-up: 1966; third place: 1970

References

External links

1942 births
Living people
German expatriate sportspeople in Japan
German expatriate sportspeople in Malta
German footballers
Germany international footballers
Kickers Offenbach players
Borussia Dortmund players
SC Preußen Münster players
KFC Uerdingen 05 players
Bundesliga players
2. Bundesliga players
1966 FIFA World Cup players
1970 FIFA World Cup players
German football managers
FC Admira Wacker Mödling managers
Dynamo Dresden managers
Galatasaray S.K. (football) managers
J1 League managers
Gamba Osaka managers
Expatriate football managers in Japan
1. FC Lokomotive Leipzig managers
Süper Lig managers
FC Schalke 04 managers
German expatriate football managers
Expatriate football managers in Iceland
Iceland national football team managers
Expatriate football managers in Malta
Malta national football team managers
Expatriate football managers in Thailand
Thailand national football team managers
Silesian-German people
People from Bruntál
People from Sudetenland
Association football forwards
Borussia Dortmund non-playing staff
West German expatriate sportspeople in Iceland
German expatriate sportspeople in Thailand
West German expatriate sportspeople in Turkey
German expatriate sportspeople in Austria
Expatriate football managers in Austria
West German footballers
West German football managers
West German expatriate football managers
Sudeten German people
People from Main-Spessart
Sportspeople from Lower Franconia
Footballers from Bavaria